Electronic Notes in Theoretical Computer Science is an electronic computer science journal published by Elsevier, started in 1995. Its issues include many post-proceedings for workshops, etc. The journal is abstracted and indexed in Scopus and Science Citation Index.

Electronic Notes in Theoretical Computer Science has been discontinued as of 2021.

References

Computer science journals
Elsevier academic journals
Publications established in 1995